Alisa Kleybanova and Monica Niculescu were the defending champions, but Niculsecu chose not to participate that year.
Kleybanova chose to compete with Alexandra Dulgheru. However, they lost to Sorana Cîrstea and Anabel Medina Garrigues in the semifinals.
Timea Bacsinszky and Tathiana Garbin became the new champions, after they won 6–3, 6–3, against Cîrstea and Medina Garrigues in the finals.

Seeds

Draw

Main draw
{{16TeamBracket-Compact-Tennis3
| RD1=First round
| RD2=Quarterfinals
| RD3=Semifinals
| RD4=Final
| RD1-seed01=1
| RD1-team01=
| RD2-score01-1=2
| RD2-score01-2=6
| RD2-score01-3=[10]
| RD2-seed02= 
| RD2-team02= S Klemenschits A Klepač
| RD2-score02-1=6
| RD2-score02-2=3
| RD2-score02-3=[7]
| RD2-seed03=3
| RD2-team03= A Dulgheru A Kleybanova
| RD2-score03-1=6
| RD2-score03-2=6
| RD2-score03-3= 
| RD2-seed04=WC
| RD2-team04= V Golubic B Szávay
| RD2-score04-1=3
| RD2-score04-2=2
| RD2-score04-3= 
| RD2-seed05= 
| RD2-team05= D Kustova L Tsurenko
| RD2-score05-1=2
| RD2-score05-2=7
| RD2-score05-3=[10]
| RD2-seed06=4
| RD2-team06= M Koryttseva IR Olaru
| RD2-score06-1=6
| RD2-score06-2=5
| RD2-score06-3=[6]
| RD2-seed07= 
| RD2-team07= A Chakvetadze P Hercog
| RD2-score07-1=3
| RD2-score07-2=7
| RD2-score07-3=[7]
| RD2-seed08=2
| RD2-team08= T Bacsinszky T Garbin
| RD2-score08-1=6
| RD2-score08-2=5
| RD2-score08-3=[10]

| RD3-seed01=1
| RD3-team01=

External links
Main Draw

GDF Suez Grand Prix - Doubles
GDF Suez Grand Prix - Doubles
Budapest Grand Prix